Wilder Creek is a stream in the U.S. state of Washington.

Wilder Creek was named after H. A. Wilder, a pioneer miner.

See also
List of rivers of Washington

References

Rivers of Okanogan County, Washington
Rivers of Washington (state)